The Taiwan Indigenous Peoples Cultural Park is a cultural park about Taiwanese aborigines in Beiye Village, Majia Township, Pingtung County, Taiwan.

History
The cultural park was originally established in 1987 as Machia Aboriginal Cultural Village.

Architecture
The cultural park spans over an area of 82.65 hectares. It is divided into four areas, which are welcoming district, Tamaluwan district, Naluwan district and Fuguwan district.

Exhibitions
The cultural park exhibits the lifestyle and cultural heritage of the nine main aboriginal tribes in Taiwan.

See also
 List of tourist attractions in Taiwan

References

External links
 

1987 establishments in Taiwan
Cultural centers in Pingtung County
Taiwanese indigenous peoples